Charlotte Catholic is a diocesan high school in Charlotte, North Carolina, United States founded in 1955. The school is accredited by the Southern Association of Colleges and Schools.  It is located in the Roman Catholic Diocese of Charlotte. Charlotte Catholic has a student to teacher ratio of 15:4.

Athletics

The school's mascot is the cougar.  Charlotte Catholic's school colors are red, white and Columbia blue and occasionally black for special sports games. CCHS has 31 teams competing in 14 different sports as members of the Southern Meck 8 Conference. It has been in the 2A, 3A, an 4A classifications, and is currently a 3A school. Charlotte Catholic is one of only three non-public school members of the North Carolina High School Athletic Association (NCHSAA).

Swimming

The women's swim team won fourteen consecutive state championships from 2002 to 2015. In 2006 during Catholic's first season in the 3A division, the men's and women's swim teams both won state championships. Both teams won consecutive state swim championships from 2006 to 2008.

Lacrosse

On May 15, 2010, the Charlotte Catholic Women's Lacrosse team became the first North Carolina Women's Lacrosse state champions in NCHSAA history. The Men's Lacrosse team won its first NCHSAA state championship in 2014.

Rugby

Charlotte Catholic's Rugby team in 2010 had a perfect regular season and won all three of its matches at USA Rugby South High School Championships, advancing to the National championships. In 2011, Charlotte Catholic again competed in the National Championships finishing in 4th place.

Basketball

During the 2015–2016 school year Charlotte Catholic won both the men's basketball and football 4A State Championships.

Catholic and Country Day Football Rivalry

The Cook (Oddo) Cup is an annual football game between Charlotte Catholic and Charlotte Country Day School (CCDS), with the football fields alternating schools each year. The cup is named after Country Day's Coach Cook.

Football

Catholic won their first football state championship in 1977. In 2005, the Cougars won the NCHSAA Division 3AA Football State Championship, after winning the 2AA Title in 2004. Catholic went 32–0 during the 2004 and 2005 seasons. After taking over from Coach Oddo in 2014, new head coach Mike Brodowicz has led Catholic to unprecedented success in football. Since then, Brodowicz led Catholic to the NCHSAA 4A state championship game in his first season, falling to New Bern High School. In 2015, Brodowicz led Catholic to their first 4A State Championship, defeating Junius H Rose High School of Greenville, NC. In 2016, Catholic lost to James B. Dudley High School (led by future Virginia Tech QB Hendon Hooker) in the NCHSAA Semi-Finals. Catholic was moved to 3A for all sports, and the 3A classification for football in 2017. Catholic won three straight State Championships in football from 2017–2019: 2017 over Havelock High School, 2018 over Jacksonville High School, and 2019 over Southern Nash High School. They now reside in the Southern Carolinas Conference, consisting mainly of teams from Union County such as Weddington High School, Marvin Ridge High School, and Monroe High School. Catholic was recognized by MaxPreps as the best football program in North Carolina during the 2010s.

Fine arts

The school puts on two major theatrical productions per year: a fall drama and a spring musical produced by the drama department. The shows are produced on the stage within the gymnasium. There are also 2 major productions done per year by the chorus and honors chorus. The final production usually has a set of songs done by the graduating seniors of both classes.

The Marching and Symphonic Bands placed first for their division in the 2009 Providence Cup marching band competition. They also won 1st place Marching, 1st place Concert Band, and 1st place Grand Champion in a competition in Orlando's Universal Studios.  In Ireland, the band performed in the Limerick Marching Showcase, winning Best International Band, and in the Dublin St. Patrick's Day Parade, where the band won Best Overall Band. In 2015, the Marching Band swept first-place awards in Class A with an overall score of 80.79 at the Cuthbertson Showcase of Bands, the first such awards won since 2009.  On Thanksgiving Day, 2016 the band participated in the McDonald's Thanksgiving Day Parade in Chicago, IL. As of 2017, the band has ceased performing drilled halftime shows and attending competitions.

Controversy

Principal Healy

In 2014, Jerry Healy, Charlotte Catholic's principal, resigned amidst speculation that he had been embezzling money from a fund set up to aid lower-income families in sending their children to the school.  In 2015 Healy pleaded guilty to stealing more than $160,000 from the school as well as the foundation over a seven-year period. While prosecutors suggested probation with no action to take him into custody, in April 2016 U.S. District Judge Frank Whitney Jr. sentenced Healy to three months in a halfway house. Until this point, Healy was a well-known and well-liked member of the Catholic school system community, having served as principal at Charlotte Catholic for over a decade and working closely with the diocese for 44 years.

Lonnie Billard Lawsuit

On January 11, 2017, Lonnie Billard took action to sue Charlotte Catholic High School on an account of discrimination. Billard claims he lost his teaching job at Catholic due to him announcing wedding plans for a long time male partner. The Federal Lawsuit accuses CCHS, Meckenburg Area Catholic Schools, and the Roman Catholic Diocese of Charlotte of illegal discrimination of him due to his sexual preference. Billard was previously a teacher of the year recipient in 2012, when fully employed by Catholic, until his resign the same year. On October 25, 2014, of which just weeks before North Carolina's same-sex marriage law was eliminated, Billard posted his wedding announcement on Facebook. The lawsuit states that on Christmas Day he was fired as a sub at CCHS.  On January 9, 2015, Billard informed Charlotte Media of his termination from Catholic. Multiple legal directors agreed that even though it's a religiously affiliated school, it does not have any right to refuse the Title VII of the Civil Rights Act of 1964. The complaint, filled by the state's office of the American Civil Liberties Union, declares back pay, benefits, punitive damage, compensatory damages for emotional distress, a court order blocking the school and Catholic leaders from taking similar actions in the future, and his substitute teacher job back. In 2021, a federal judge granted Summary Judgment in Billard's favor, the diocese implied it would appeal to the Fourth Circuit.

Sister Jane Dominic Speech

On March 21, 2014, Charlotte Catholic welcomed Sister Jane Dominic Laurel, a Dominican Nun trained at the Pontifical University, to give a speech on Catholic beliefs on gender roles.  During the speech, Sister Jane Dominic suggested that masturbation and pornography can lead young adults to become homosexuals and that children raised in single parent homes have a greater likelihood to grow up to be gay.  Students and parents were not told ahead of time of the content of her speech.  An online petition written by Charlotte Catholic alumni Emma Winters(c/o 2014) against the content of her speech garnered 2000 signatures and a letter-writing campaign to the Dioceses of Charlotte and the U.S. Conference of Catholic Bishops was initiated. Shortly thereafter, a counter petition was written by then Charlotte Catholic student Jack Denton, who would later be involved in a controversial religious liberty suit at Florida State University, (c/o 2017) which defended the dignity of Sister Jane Dominic Laurel since it had come under attack after her lecture. It garnered over 2500 signatures. A parents meeting held by the high school later in the week to discuss the speech attracted nearly a thousand people and the meeting went over an hour longer than scheduled due to the number of parents who wished to ask questions or make comments. The speech and fallout received national media attention.  The Dioceses of Charlotte and Bishop Peter Jugis continued to support the teachings of Sister Jane Dominic and she was vigorously supported by Catholic media.  In early April, Sister Jane Dominic cancelled all of her scheduled speaking events and took a sabbatical from her teaching position at Aquinas College. The President of Aquinas College stated that in her speech Sister Jane Dominic “spoke clearly on matters of faith and morals” but “her deviation into realms of sociology and anthropology was beyond the scope of her expertise.”

Vaping

On November 17, 2017, Charlotte Catholic announced that disciplinary measures would include the prohibition of vaping devices and letters were sent home on this issue. The use of such devices has led to the expulsion of a "handful" of students.

Staff Member

In March 2018, Charlotte Catholic fired a school staff member after two students aged between 16 and 17 came forward with inappropriate text conversations.

Firing of Sister Agnes

On May 17, 2020, the contract of Sister Agnes, a member of the Theology department at Charlotte Catholic, was not renewed.  A student-created petition garnered thousands of signatures demanding the reversal of this decision.

Notable alumni
 Laura DuPont – tennis player and first female national champion in any sport at the University of North Carolina at Chapel Hill
 Elijah Hood – former American football running back
 Kevin Martin – served as 25th Chairman of the U.S. Federal Communications Commission (FCC)
 Brendan McDonough – former MLS player
 Mick Mulvaney – acting White House Chief of Staff and 41st Director of the Office of Management and Budget (OMB)
 Donnie Smith – former MLS player
 H.A. Wheeler – served as president and general manager of Charlotte Motor Speedway

See also

List of high schools in North Carolina
National Catholic Educational Association

References

External links

 Charlotte Catholic Bands
 Roman Catholic Diocese of Charlotte

Schools in Charlotte, North Carolina
Catholic secondary schools in North Carolina
Educational institutions established in 1955
1955 establishments in North Carolina